The 2018 Winnipeg National Bank Challenger was a professional tennis tournament played on outdoor hard courts. It was the 3rd edition, for men, and 6th edition, for women, of the tournament and part of the 2018 ATP Challenger Tour and the 2018 ITF Women's Circuit. It took place in Winnipeg, Manitoba, Canada between July 10 and July 15, 2018.

Men's singles main-draw entrants

Seeds

1 Rankings are as of July 2, 2018

Other entrants
The following players received wildcards into the singles main draw:
 Alexis Galarneau
 Pavel Krainik
 Benjamin Sigouin
 David Volfson

The following players received entry from the qualifying draw:
 Chung Yun-seong
 Marc-Andrea Hüsler
 Evan Song
 Mikael Torpegaard

Women's singles main-draw entrants

Seeds

1 Rankings are as of July 2, 2018

Other entrants
The following players received wildcards into the singles main draw:
 Anca Craciun
 Catherine Leduc
 Alexandra Mikhailuk
 Layne Sleeth

The following players received entry from the qualifying draw:
 Kelly Chen
 Emily Fanning
 Lorraine Guillermo
 Mai Hontama
 McCartney Kessler
 Raveena Kingsley
 Jada Robinson
 Ronit Yurovsky

Champions

Men's singles

 Jason Kubler def.  Lucas Miedler 6–1, 6–1.

Women's singles
 Rebecca Marino def.  Julia Glushko, 7–6(7–3), 7–6(7–4)

Men's doubles
 
 Marc-Andrea Hüsler /  Sem Verbeek def.  Gerard Granollers /  Marcel Granollers 6–7(5–7), 6–3, [14–12].

Women's doubles
 Akiko Omae /  Victoria Rodríguez def.  Julia Glushko /  Sanaz Marand, 7–6(7–2), 6–3

External links
Official website

2018 ATP Challenger Tour
2018 ITF Women's Circuit
2018
2018 in Canadian tennis